Spelaeogriphacea is an order of crustaceans that grow to no more than . Little is known about the ecology of the order.

Only four species, all subterranean, have been described. Of the three genera, Potiicoara  is known only from a cave in Brazil's Mato Grosso, Spelaeogriphus  only from a cave on Table Mountain in South Africa, and the two Mangkurtu  species only from individual Australian aquifers. This widely separated distribution implies an early origin for the group, hypothesised as emerging at least  in the Tethys Sea around Gondwana.

The fossil species Acadiocaris novascotica is also considered to belong to the Spelaeogriphacea.

References

External links

Malacostraca
Crustacean orders
Freshwater crustaceans
Extant Carboniferous first appearances
Mississippian first appearances
Prehistoric arthropod orders